MS Ivan Franko was the first  owned by the Soviet Unions Black Sea Shipping Company. She was built in 1964 by V.E.B. Mathias-Thesen Werft, Wismar, East Germany. She was scrapped in 1997 at Alang, India.

References

 

Cruise ships
Ships built in East Germany
Passenger ships of the Soviet Union
Ships built in Wismar
1964 ships
East Germany–Soviet Union relations
Ships of Black Sea Shipping Company